Roosdaal is a municipality located in the Belgian province of Flemish Brabant. The municipality comprises the towns of Borchtlombeek, Onze-Lieve-Vrouw-Lombeek, Pamel and Strijtem. It is also situated in the Pajottenland.

On January 1, 2016, Roosdaal had a total population of 11,494. The total area is 21.69 km² which gives a population density of 530 inhabitants per km². Roosdaal is well known in Flanders for its berries through its annual strawberry convention.

In 2008, during a national television competition, Onze-lieve-vrouw-Lombeek was elected as "The most beautiful village in Flemish Brabant", but it lost the overall Flemish competition to the town of Oud-Rekem.

Notable people
 Frans Van Cauwelaert (b. 10 January 1880 – 17 May 1961), politician and lawyer.

References

External links
 
Official website - Available only in Dutch

Municipalities of Flemish Brabant